Kelly Miller may refer to:

Kelly Miller (basketball) (born 1978), American WNBA player
Kelly Miller (ice hockey, born 1963), American former NHL player
Kelly Miller (scientist) (1863–1939), American mathematician, sociologist and journalist
Kelly Miller (actress), Betsy in George of the Jungle (film) (1997)